is a Japanese actress.

Filmography

Film
Itoshino Half Moon (1987)
Shall We Dance? (1996)
Mutant Girls Squad (2010) - Sayuri
Runway Beat (2011) - Mei's mother
 Lady in White (2018)

Television
Kōkōsei Fūfu (1983) - Noriko "Tenko" Anzai
Furyō Shōjo to Yobarete (1984) - Shōko Soga
Dokuganryū Masamune (1987) - Senhime
Gregory Horror Show (1999) - My Son
Tensou Sentai Goseiger (2010) - Moune's Mother (ep. 25)

Video games
Gregory Horror Show: Soul Collector (2003) - My Son

External links
Official Homepage

JMDb Profile (in Japanese)

1964 births
Living people
Japanese actresses
Japanese television personalities
Japanese idols
People from Nagoya